The United Nations Educational, Scientific and Cultural Organization (UNESCO) World Heritage Sites are places of importance to cultural or natural heritage as described in the UNESCO World Heritage Convention, established in 1972. Cultural heritage consists of monuments (such as architectural works, monumental sculptures, or inscriptions), groups of buildings, and sites (including archaeological sites). Natural features (consisting of physical and biological formations), geological and physiographical formations (including habitats of threatened species of animals and plants), and natural sites which are important from the point of view of science, conservation or natural beauty, are defined as natural heritage. Poland ratified the convention on 29 June 1976, making its historical sites eligible for inclusion on the list.

, there are 17 World Heritages Sites in Poland, 15 of which are cultural, and two are natural sites. The first two sites inscribed on the World Heritage List were Wieliczka Salt Mine and Historic Centre of Kraków, in 1978. The most recent addition is the Bieszczady National Park as an extension to the Ancient and Primeval Beech Forests of the Carpathians and Other Regions of Europe, listed in July 2021. Four of the sites are transnational. The Białowieża Forest is shared with Belarus, the Wooden Tserkvas of Carpathian Region with Ukraine, the Muskauer Park / Park Mużakowski with Germany and the Primeval Beech Forests is shared among 18 European countries. In addition, there are five sites on the tentative list.

World Heritage Sites
UNESCO lists sites under ten criteria; each entry must meet at least one of the criteria. Criteria i through vi are cultural, and vii through x are natural.

Tentative list
In addition to sites inscribed on the World Heritage List, member states can maintain a list of tentative sites that they may consider for nomination. Nominations for the World Heritage List are only accepted if the site was previously listed on the tentative list. As of 2022, Poland lists five properties on its tentative list.

See also
 List of Historic Monuments in Poland
 Seven Wonders of Poland
 Tourism in Poland
 UNESCO Memory of the World Register

References

External links

  Polish UNESCO Committee

 
World Heritage Sites
Poland
World Heritage Sites